Space Relations: A Slightly Gothic Interplanetary Tale is a space opera novel by Donald Barr, the father of former US Attorney General William Barr, originally published on 17 September 1973 by Charterhouse and distributed by McKay. 
It was reprinted by Fawcett Crest Books in February 1975. It is one of only two novels Barr is known to have written, the other being A Planet in Arms.

Plot
In the future, humans have formed an intergalactic empire ruled by aristocrats. During a time of war with the Plith, an empire of ant-like alien bug people, ambassador John Craig, a formerly Liberal Earth man in his 30s, is dispatched to the strategically important planet Kossar, a human colony that was settled by the Carlyle Society as a place of exile for political extremists and now is ruled by an oligarchical high council of seven nobles, each of whom is in charge of a different domain with its own traditions. Their boredom and absolute power have driven them to madness, to the point that Kossar's entry into the empire has been stymied by the Man-Inhabited Planets Treaty's clause (written by Craig) against alliances with slave owning societies, due to its practice of kidnapping humans to become illegal playthings of the galaxy's super-rich.

Craig, who now is campaigning to bring Kossar into the empire, had previously been to the planet when the passenger ship on which he was travelling on a return trip from the Betelgeuse Conference was captured by space pirates. While en route to Kassar, one of the pirates awakened Craig and the other prisoners to rape a 15-year-old virginal redheaded female captive in front of them; the rapist's fellow pirates later hear of this and dock his pay as punishment for spoiling her market value. Craig then spent two years as a slave of the beautiful, sensual, and sadistic Lady Morgan Sidney, the only female member of the oligarchy, with whom he became romantically involved. Together, they lived in her castle, ruling over and engaging in sexual relations with those under their dominion, including an enslaved teenager at a clinic used to breed enslaved people. When Craig stumbles on hints of an alien invasion, he realizes he must escape to save humanity.

Craig is depicted as undisturbed by Lady Morgan's sadism. When he is ordered to sexually assault the enslaved teenager, he enjoys his participation in the act.

Reception
In 1973, Kirkus Reviews described the novel as "a coruscatingly literate tale for grown-ups".

In 2008, the novel was criticized by Pornokitsch for devoting too much attention to character development rather than world-building.  The review notes that the narrative is split in two, between the present-day official visitation of Craig to the planet Kossar, and his past experiences as Lady Morgan's slave.

The novel's events are set during a war between intergalactic human empire and "sinister" bug people. The world of Kossar is human, but independent of the empire due to its ruling aristocracy's refusal to abolish the slave trade, which represents the very foundation of Kossar's class system and economy. The review notes that the novel does not fully explore these premises. The war is used to explain why a "backwater world" like Kossar became important to the empire, but the conflict is merely referenced and not actually depicted. The novel also hints at the complex politics of both Earth and Kossar and their roots in Machiavellianism, but these politics remain largely unexplored.

The main theme of the novel is the "torrid romance" between a slave and his owner (John Craig and Lady Morgan). This allows the author to explore the issues of slavery and domination. The reviewer notes however that neither character experiences growth or change through the novel's events. He found both main characters to be "fairly obnoxious". While the author repeatedly reminds the readers that slavery is wrong, he tries to depict both Craig and Morgan as wise, talented, and heroic. The reviewer finds it hard to view them as heroes, since their actions are not heroic in nature. Throughout the novel, both main characters "freely kill, torture, seduce and make sweeping political decisions on behalf of thousands of people".

Another flaw of the novel is its depiction of Craig as a poet. The prose of the novel is interrupted by the character's poetic compositions, including a number of sonnets. The reviewer sees this as a failed attempt to add depth to the character, and finds these interruptions to be irritating.

The novel was described in a Vice article as "both comically amoral and insufferably pretentious. To be fair, these traits were common in 1970s sci-fi." Becky Ferreira has described the novel as "highly unsettling", due to its depiction of rape of enslaved people, particularly teenage girls, and other coercive sex acts. The sex acts described are performed "for the dual purposes of entertainment and controlled procreation". Ferreira found disgusting the novel's fixation on the sexualization of adolescents. She notes that the adult characters are subjected to infantilization. The novel's dialogue includes "casually unsettling observations". She cites as an example a character remarking that pederasty lacks in "aesthetic appeal". She views the novel as sexualizing minors and fetishizing rape, but notes that such elements were normalized in science fiction.

Space Relations saw increased public attention after Barr's former employee Jeffrey Epstein died in a jail cell.  Reportedly "conspiratorial corners of the internet" have seen similarities between the violent sexual depictions in Space Relations and Epstein's alleged sex trafficking activities and obsessions. Sellers of the novel on eBay explicitly advertise its connection to Epstein in their descriptions of it. Ferreira notes that the connections between Donald Barr and Jeffrey Epstein are "flimsy", and dismisses any connection between the novel and Epstein's crimes as speculative. 
It was also included as a key plot point in the season 4 finale of the legal drama The Good Fight.

References

1973 American novels
1973 science fiction novels
Jeffrey Epstein
Novels about rape
Novels about slavery
Novels set on fictional planets
Novels set in the future
Space opera novels
Novels by Donald Barr